Ruslan Oleksandrovych Babenko (born 8 July 1992) is a Ukrainian professional footballer who plays as a central midfielder for Dnipro-1.

Career
Babenko is a product of the Dnipro Dnipropetrovsk academy. He made his first team debut in the Premier League in a match against Kryvbas Kryvyi Rih on 23 April 2011.

On 19 February 2016, Babenko signed a 2-year deal for Tippeligaen club Bodø/Glimt coming as a free transfer. After just one season in Bodø/Glimt he left the club after they relegated.

Career statistics

References

External links 
 
 
Profile on Official Dnipro Website (Ukr)

1992 births
Living people
Footballers from Dnipro
Ukrainian footballers
Ukraine youth international footballers
Ukraine under-21 international footballers
Association football midfielders
FC Dnipro players
FC Volyn Lutsk players
FC Stal Kamianske players
FK Bodø/Glimt players
FC Zorya Luhansk players
FC Chornomorets Odesa players
Raków Częstochowa players
FC Olimpik Donetsk players
FC Polissya Zhytomyr players
FC Metalist Kharkiv players
SC Dnipro-1 players
Ukrainian Premier League players
Ukrainian First League players
Ekstraklasa players
Eliteserien players
Ukrainian expatriate footballers
Expatriate footballers in Norway
Ukrainian expatriate sportspeople in Norway
Expatriate footballers in Poland
Ukrainian expatriate sportspeople in Poland